Las Plassas, Is Pratzas or Is Platzas in the Sardinian language, is a comune (municipality) in the Province of South Sardinia in the Italian region Sardinia, located about  north of Cagliari and about  northeast of Sanluri.

Las Plassas borders the following municipalities: Barumini, Pauli Arbarei, Tuili, Villamar, Villanovafranca.

References

Cities and towns in Sardinia